The 2023 Atlantic 10 women's basketball tournament was a postseason women's basketball tournament for the 2022–23 season of the Atlantic 10 Conference (A-10). It was held from March 1–5 2023, in Wilmington, Delaware at Chase Fieldhouse.

Seeds 
All 15 A-10 schools participated in the tournament. Teams were seeded by winning percentage within the conference, with a tiebreaker system to seed teams with identical percentages. The top 9 teams received a first-round bye and the top four teams received a double-bye, automatically advancing them to the quarterfinals.

Schedule 

*Game times in Eastern Time.

Bracket 

* denotes overtime period

References 

2022–23 Atlantic 10 Conference women's basketball season
Atlantic 10 women's basketball tournament
College basketball tournaments in Delaware
Atlantic 10 women's basketball tournament
Atlantic 10 women's basketball tournament
Sports competitions in  Wilmington, Delaware
Women's sports in Delaware